Events from the year 1803 in Spain

Incumbents
 Monarch – Charles IV

Events

The members of the Royal Botanical Expedition to New Spain finally returned to Spain at different times during 1803. This scientific expedition explored the flora and fauna of the territories of New Spain between 1787 and 1803.

Births

 

 - Pedro de Alcántara Álvarez de Toledo, 13th Marquis of Villafranca

Deaths

 1 February - María Isidra de Guzmán y de la Cerda, scholar (born 1768)
 
 
 - José Camarón Bonanat

References

 
Years of the 19th century in Spain